Work in Progress is a 25-minute documentary which is part of the British Transport Films Collection. It was made in 1951 and covers various aspects of British Transport as described below.

Tunnel through the Pennines 
First is a piece on a third  tunnel being excavated under the Pennines at Woodhead, Derbyshire, estimated to take three years to complete. Tunnelers are shown being lowered into a  ventilation shaft, from where they use shovels to dig out blasted rock.

Road haulage in Scotland 
Second topic is the work of British Road Services in Campbeltown, Scotland.

Marshalling in Cambridgeshire 

The third topic shows the work of the Whitemoor marshalling yard in Cambridgeshire.

Buses in Bristol 
The fourth topic shows the bus system in Bristol, showing how the company deals with a complaint from a customer and also shows factory workers rushing at the end of shift to a fleet of buses, where it is claimed that 6,000 are moved in 20 minutes.

Ferry across the Channel 
The fifth topic shows the ferry from Calais to Dover, and how its radar is used to navigate into Dover Harbour in fog.

External links 
British Transport Films

British Transport Films
British documentary films